Redfall is an upcoming first-person shooter video game developed by Arkane Studios Austin and published by Bethesda Softworks. The game is set to be released for Microsoft Windows and Xbox Series X/S on May 2, 2023.

Gameplay
Redfall is an open world first-person shooter video game that features both single-player and cooperative multiplayer modes. Players can choose among four playable characters — each with unique backgrounds and abilities — to fight against vampires as well as human enemies within the game.

Premise
The game is set within the fictional titular island town of Redfall, Massachusetts, United States. After a failed scientific experiment, a legion of vampires invaded and isolated the town from the outside world. Trapped inside Redfall, players must choose among 4 unique survivors — cryptozoologist and inventor Devinder Crousley, telekinetic student Layla Ellison, combat engineer Remi de la Rosa, and supernatural former US military special forces sniper veteran Jacob Boyer — and slay their enemies, vampires and human colaborators alike.

Development
Redfall was announced during the Xbox and Bethesda E3 2021 showcase on June 13, 2021. The game is being developed by Arkane Studios at their Austin, Texas locations. Co-Creative Director Ricardo Bare stated that the game will continue Arkane's tradition of making each game different from the last, but will still focus on deep worldbuilding and inventive game mechanics. On May 12, 2022, it was announced that the release was delayed to the first half of 2023. On January 25, 2023, Arkane Austin announced that Redfall will release on May 2, 2023.

References

External links
 

Upcoming video games scheduled for 2023
Action-adventure games
First-person shooters
Arkane Studios games
Bethesda Softworks games
Multiplayer and single-player video games
Xbox Series X and Series S games
Unreal Engine games
Urban fantasy video games
Video games developed in the United States
Video games set on islands
Video games about vampires
Windows games
Video games set in Massachusetts
Video games directed by Harvey Smith